Osisang Dibech Chilton (born 23 February 1996) is a Palauan swimmer. She competed at the 2020 Summer Olympics, in the women's 50 m freestyle.

Career 
She competed in the women's 200 metre backstroke event at the 2017 World Aquatics Championships. In 2019, she represented Palau at the 2019 World Aquatics Championships held in Gwangju, South Korea. She competed in the women's 100 metre freestyle and women's 100 metre backstroke events. In both events she did not advance to compete in the semi-finals.

References

External links
 

1996 births
Living people
Palauan female swimmers
Place of birth missing (living people)
Female backstroke swimmers
Palauan female freestyle swimmers
Swimmers at the 2020 Summer Olympics
Olympic swimmers of Palau